Kim Bong-man (born 7 April 1963) is a South Korean fencer. He competed in the team épée event at the 1984 Summer Olympics.

References

External links
 

1963 births
Living people
South Korean male épée fencers
Olympic fencers of South Korea
Fencers at the 1984 Summer Olympics
Asian Games medalists in fencing
Fencers at the 1986 Asian Games
South Korean épée fencers
Korea National Sport University alumni
Asian Games gold medalists for South Korea
Asian Games bronze medalists for South Korea
Medalists at the 1986 Asian Games